"When We Are Together" is a song by Scottish band Texas from their fifth studio album, The Hush (1999). It was released as the third and final single from the album on 15 November 1999. The song debuted and peaked at  12 in the United Kingdom and spent nine weeks on the UK Singles Chart, and it became a top-20 hit in Finland, where it reached No. 17.

Track listings
 UK CD1 
 "When We Are Together" (The Together Mix)
 "In Our Lifetime" (Live at Barrowlands)
 "Say What You Want (All Day, Every Day)" (live at the Brits featuring Method Man)
 "When We Are Together" (the video)

 UK CD2 
 "When We Are Together" (The Together Mix)
 "When We Are Together" (Jules Club Together Remix)
 "Summer Son" ("The Euro Bootleg")

 UK cassette single and European CD single  "When We Are Together" (The Together Mix)
 "Say What You Want (All Day, Every Day)" (live at the Brits featuring Method Man)

Credits and personnel
Credits are lifted from The Hush album booklet.Studios Recorded at Shar's house and Park Lane (Glasgow, Scotland)
 Mixed at the Mix Suite, Olympic Studios (London, England)Personnel'''

 Texas – all instruments, programming
 Johnny McElhone – writing, production (as Johnny Mac), string arrangement
 Sharleen Spiteri – writing
 Eddie Campbell – string arrangement
 Ally McErlaine
 Giuliano Gizzi – additional guitar
 Emma Kerr – strings
 Rachel England – strings
 Dervilagh Cooper – strings
 Susan Dance – strings
 Mark "Spike" Stent – mixing

Charts

Weekly charts

Year-end charts

References

1999 singles
1999 songs
Mercury Records singles
Songs written by Johnny McElhone
Songs written by Sharleen Spiteri
Texas (band) songs